Filters are appearance-altering digital image effects often used on social media. They initially simulated the effects of camera filters, and they have since developed with facial recognition technology and computer-generated augmented reality. Social media filters—especially beauty filters—are often used to alter the appearance of selfies taken on smartphones or other similar devices.

History 

In 2010, Apple introduced the iPhone 4—the first iPhone model with a front camera. It gave rise to a dramatic increase in selfies, which could be touched up with more flattering lighting effects with applications such as Instagram. The American photographer Cole Rise was involved in the creation of the original filters for Instagram around 2010, designing several of them himself, including Sierra, Mayfair, Sutro, Amaro and Willow. In September, 2011, the Instagram 2.0 update for the application introduced "live filters," which allowed the user to preview the effect of the filter while shooting with the application's camera. #NoFilter, a hashtag label to describe an image that had not been filtered, became popular around 2013.

An update in 2014 allowed users to adjust the intensity of the filters as well as fine-tune other aspects of the image, features that had been available for years on applications such as VSCO and Litely.

In 2014, Snapchat started releasing sponsored filters to monetize the participatory use of the application. In September 2015, Snapchat acquired Looksery and released a feature called "lenses," animated filters using facial recognition technology. Some of the early lenses available on Snapchat at the time were Heart Eyes, Terminator, Puke Rainbows, Old, Scary, Rage Face, Heart Avalanche. The Coachella filter released April 2016 was a popular early augmented reality filter.

Studies 
A study from Yahoo! Labs and the Georgia Institute of Technology found that filtered photos outperform unfiltered photos in terms of engagement on social media, with a 21% higher chance of being viewed and a 45% higher chance of generating a comment.

In 2020, it was reported that 600 million people monthly were using augmented reality filters on Instagram or Facebook, while 76% of Snapchat users were using them daily.

Reception 
It has been noted that beauty filters on social media tend to highlight Eurocentric features, like lighter eyes, a smaller nose, and flushed cheeks. These filters have been documented as contributing to social media users' feelings of body image insecurity, sometimes called "filter dysmorphia." This trend has led some to seek plastic surgery to make themselves look how they appear in social media filters.

References 

Social media
Digital photography
Selfies
Augmented reality
Facial recognition software
Popular culture
Internet culture